Saint Denise (Dionysia, Dionisia, Denyse) may refer to: 

Saints Peter, Andrew, Paul, and Denise, martyred at Lampsacus (3rd century)
Saints Denise, Dativa, Leontia, Tertius, Emilianus, Boniface, Majoricus, and Servus, martyred in Africa (5th century) 
Dionisia de Santa María Mitas Talangpaz, Philippine religious figure, Servant of God since 1999 while being considered for possible canonization as a saint

 and Arno victor dorian